Jarriel King (born July 27, 1987) is a gridiron football offensive tackle. He played for the Seattle Seahawks of the NFL previously. King played college football at South Carolina. He was cut from the Seahawks in March 2012 after the team learned of his arrest for sexual assault in South Carolina.  According to the alleged victim, she "repeatedly told [King and another man] to stop." On July 31, 2014, he was acquitted of all charges.

Professional career

References

External links
Toronto Argonauts bio 

1987 births
Living people
American football offensive tackles
South Carolina Gamecocks football players
New York Giants players
Saskatchewan Roughriders players
Seattle Seahawks players
Toronto Argonauts players
People acquitted of sex crimes
Players of American football from South Carolina
People from North Charleston, South Carolina